Károly Nóti (1 February 1892 – 28 May 1954) was a Hungarian screenwriter. For his work in Germany and Britain he was credited as Karl Noti. During the 1930s Nóti was one of the leading and most prolific screenwriters in the Hungarian industry.

Selected filmography
 Twice Married (German-language, 1930)
 Three Days Confined to Barracks (German-language, 1930) 
 My Cousin from Warsaw (French-language, 1931) 
** My Cousin from Warsaw (German-language, 1931) 
 Duty is Duty (German-language, 1931) 
 Terror of the Garrison (German-language, 1931)
 Peace of Mind (German-language, 1931) 
 Annemarie, the Bride of the Company (German-language, 1931) 
 Hyppolit, the Butler (Hungarian-language, 1931) 
** Er und sein Diener (German-language, 1931) 
 No Money Needed (German-language, 1932) 
 Scandal on Park Street (German-language, 1932) 
 Pardon, tévedtem (Hungarian-language, 1933) 
** Scandal in Budapest (German-language, 1933) 
 Happy (English-language, 1933) 
 A Precocious Girl (German-language, 1934) 
 The New Relative (Hungarian-language, 1934) 
 Viereinhalb Musketiere (German-language, 1935) 
 No Monkey Business (English-language, 1935) 
 Catherine the Last (German-language, 1936) 
 Compliments of Mister Flow (French-language, 1936) 
 I May See Her Once a Week (Hungarian-language, 1937) 
 Magda Expelled (Hungarian-language, 1938) 
  (French-language, 1938) 
 The Girl Downstairs (English-language, 1938) 
 The Talking Rob (Hungarian-language, 1942) 
 Not Afraid of Big Animals (German-language, 1953) 
 Three Days Confined to Barracks (German-language, 1955)

Bibliography
 Cunningham, John. Hungarian Cinema: From Coffee House to Multiplex. Wallflower Press, 2004.

References

External links
 
 

1892 births
1954 deaths
Male screenwriters
Hungarian male writers
People from Tășnad
20th-century Hungarian screenwriters